is a Buddhist temple belonging to the Shingon school, located in the city of Uda, Nara Prefecture, Japan.

Unlike many temples of the time, Murō-ji was opened to females. For that reason, the temple is also called Mount Kōya for women.

Its five storied pagoda is one of the oldest standing pagodas in Japan, dating its construction to the 9th century.

History
While legend has it that the temple was founded by the monk En no Gyōja by order of Emperor Tenmu, and later restored by Kūkai, an extant record kept by the temple, tells that a successful ritual in respect of a local dragon spirit to cure Prince Yamabe (later Emperor Kanmu)'s illness made the imperial court order a monk from the nearby temple of Kōfuku-ji, named , to construct a new temple on the site. The construction of the temple was taken over by a pupil monk , after Kenkyō's death in 793.

The numerous caves spread around Mount Murō were believed to be carved out by said dragon, and are still considered sacred.

During most of its history, Murō-ji was a subtemple of Kōfuku-ji, from the nearby city of Nara. The Ryūketsu Shrine used to be part of the Murō-ji complex until 1868, as efforts were made to separate Shinto and Buddhist institutions.

Present

Worship of the Murō dragon continues to the present day in the form of a festival called the Autumn Ryūketsu Shrine festival. During the month of October, two figures of a dragon in straw are placed on the grounds of Murō-ji and on the road to the Shinto Ryūketsu Shrine. The next day, the head priest of Murō-ji begins a procession between the temple and the Ryūketsu Shrine, stopping to conduct rituals in favor of the two straw dragon figures. While rain prayer practices are absent, the Murō dragon still serves as an important tradition of the temple and the nearby Shinto shrine.

Among the buildings that remain on the temple complex from the ninth century is the five-storied pagoda, which is the smallest of the kind standing in the open air. The pagoda suffered major damage in a 1998 typhoon, when a falling tree struck it. It was restored over the following two years.

See also
List of National Treasures of Japan (temples)
List of National Treasures of Japan (paintings)
List of National Treasures of Japan (sculptures)
 For an explanation of terms concerning Japanese Buddhism, Japanese Buddhist art, and Japanese Buddhist temple architecture, see the Glossary of Japanese Buddhism.

References

External links

National Treasures of Japan
Important Cultural Properties of Japan
Pagodas in Japan
Buddhist temples in Nara Prefecture
Uda, Nara